Connecticut is a state in the United States

Connecticut may also refer to:

Connecticut Colony, an English colony located in British America
Connecticut River, a tributary of Long Island Sound
USS Connecticut, any of seven US Navy ships named for the state
University of Connecticut, the largest public university in the state
Connecticut Huskies, the athletic program of the University of Connecticut
 Connecticut Avenue, a street in Washington, D.C.

See also